Bill or William Gaither may refer to:

Bill Gaither (blues musician) (1910–1970), American blues musician
Bill Gaither (gospel singer) (born 1936), American gospel singer
William S. Gaither, civil engineer and president of Drexel University
William Lingan Gaither, Maryland politician